This is a list of bridges in Ottawa, Ontario, Canada. They are listed from west to east and north to south. Bridges spanning Airport Parkway, the Confederation Line, Green's Creek, Highway 174, Highway 416, Highway 417, the Jock River, the Transitway, and the Trillium Line are not listed.

Spanning the Ottawa River

Spanning the Rideau River

Spanning the Rideau Canal

Spanning Patterson Creek

Spanning Nepean Inlet

See also

List of crossings of the Ottawa River

References

 
 
Bridges
Ottawa-Gatineau
Ottawa